Trimethyloxonium tetrafluoroborate is the organic compound with the formula . (It is sometimes called "Meerwein's salt" after Hans Meerwein.) It is a white solid that rapidly decomposes upon exposure to atmospheric moisture, although it is robust enough to be weighed quickly without inert atmosphere protection. Triethyloxonium tetrafluoroborate is a closely related compound.

Preparation and reactions
The compound is prepared by the reaction of boron trifluoride with dimethyl ether and epichlorohydrin:

The salt hydrolyzes readily:

Trimethyloxonium tetrafluoroborate is generally ranked as the strongest commercially available reagent for electrophilic methylation, being stronger than methyl sulfonate esters, including methyl triflate and methyl fluorosulfonate ("magic methyl"). Only the exotic dimethylhalonium reagents (X = Cl, Br, I), methyl carboranate reagents, and the transiently-generated methyldiazonium cation are stronger sources of electrophilic methyl.

Due to its high reactivity, it is rapidly destroyed by atmospheric moisture and best stored in an inert atmosphere glovebox at −20 °C. Its degradation products are corrosive, although it is considerably less hazardous than methyl triflate or methyl fluorosulfonate, on account of its lack of volatility.

References

Notes

Methylating agents
Tetrafluoroborates
Oxycations
Oxonium compounds